is a former Japanese football player.

Playing career
Matsushita was born in Fukushima Prefecture on June 6, 1978. After graduating from high school, he joined J1 League club JEF United Ichihara in 1997. He played many matches as forward and offensive midfielder in 1997. However he could hardly play in the match in 1998 and retired end of 1998 season.

Club statistics

References

External links

1978 births
Living people
Association football people from Fukushima Prefecture
Japanese footballers
J1 League players
JEF United Chiba players
Association football forwards